Fornells de la Selva is a municipality in the comarca of Gironès that forms part of the urban area of Girona.

The northern boundary is with the municipality of Girona; the southern is with Riudellots de la Selva and Campllong; the east with Quart and Llambilles; and the west with Vilablareix and Aiguaviva.

Transportation
Fornells de la Selva is located 7 km south of Girona via the N-IIa.  It also has its own railway station (with ticket sales currently closed) which is served by Renfe's Regional line from Barcelona and to Portbou.  It is also 5 km from the Girona-Costa Brava Airport.

References

External links
 Government data pages 

Municipalities in Gironès